.

People
Lejla Agolli (born 1950), Albanian composer
Lejla Basic (born 1994), Swedish footballer 
Lejla Hot (born 1986), Serbian pop singer, musician, and songwriter.
Lejla Kalamujić, Bosnian writer
Lejla Tanović (born 1994), Bosnian mountain bike racer

Music
Lejla (opera) by Karel Bendl 1868
"Lejla" (song), by Hari Mata Hari, the Bosnian entry in the 2006 Eurovision Song Contest
"Lejla", a song by Vajta, the Yugoslavian entry in the 1981 Eurovision Song Contest
Slavic feminine given names